Doraisamy Munusamy (born 2 October 1937) is a Malaysian former field hockey player. He competed in the men's tournament at the 1964 Summer Olympics.

References

External links

1937 births
Living people
Malaysian people of Tamil descent
Malaysian sportspeople of Indian descent
Malaysian male field hockey players
Olympic field hockey players of Malaysia
Field hockey players at the 1964 Summer Olympics
Place of birth missing (living people)
Asian Games medalists in field hockey
Asian Games bronze medalists for Malaysia
Medalists at the 1962 Asian Games
Field hockey players at the 1962 Asian Games